The Dumplings is an American sitcom starring James Coco and Geraldine Brooks that aired on NBC during the 1975–1976 television season. The series was based on a syndicated comic strip of the same name by Fred Lucky that ran in newspapers from 1975 to 1977.

Cast
 James Coco as Joe Dumpling
 Geraldine Brooks as Angela Dumpling
 George S. Irving as Charles Sweetzer
 George Furth as Frederic Steele
 Marcia Rodd as Stephanie
 Mort Marshall as Cully
 Jane Connell as Bridget (Norah) McKenna
 Wil Albert as The prude

Synopsis

Joe and Angela Dumpling are a very happily married and overweight couple who are very much in love with each other and with life, never have a bad thing to say about one another, and exude good cheer and enthusiasm. They operate Dudley's Take-Out, a luncheonette on the ground floor of a Manhattan skyscraper owned by the Bristol Oil Company. Charles Sweetzer, who works upstairs as executive vice president of Bristol Oil, is a regular customer, as are New York city councilman Frederic Steele, Mr. Sweetzers secretary Bridget McKenna (or Norah McKenna, according to some sources), and Angelas sister Stephanie. Cully is the Dumplings employee at the luncheonette and works as the cashier. The Dumplings obesity is a source of much humor as they interact with customers, friends, and family.

Production

The show originated as a syndicated comic strip created by Fred Lucky. Norman Lear developed the series for television and Don Nicholl, Michael Ross, and Bernie West created and produced it, with George Sunga also serving as a producer. Episode directors were Paul Bogart, Hal Cooper, and Dennis Steinmetz. Nicholl, Ross, and West all wrote for the show, as did Joseph Bonaduce, Bill Davenport, Fred S. Fox, Gary David Goldberg, Seaman Jacobs, Fred Lucky, Barry Sand, and Alan Uger.

Angela Dumpling was the final role of Geraldine Brooks career; she died in 1977.

Steve Lawrence sang the shows theme song, "Two By Two, Side By Side."

Broadcast history

NBC broadcast the pilot episode of The Dumplings on October 4, 1975. The Dumplings joined NBC's regular lineup on January 28, 1976, with a rebroadcast of the pilot in the show's regular time slot at 9:30 p.m. on Wednesdays. Its tenth and final episode aired on March 31, 1976. An eleventh episode was never broadcast.

Episodes

References

External links
Theme from The Dumplings: "Two by Two, Side by Side," performed by Steve Lawrence (audio)

NBC original programming
1976 American television series debuts
1976 American television series endings
1970s American sitcoms
English-language television shows
Television shows based on comic strips
Television shows set in New York City